This is the discography of the British post punk / synth-pop band Ultravox. While active from 1975 to 1996, the band released a number of LPs and CDs, although more discs were released after their demise. An anthology disc was planned, according to their official web page.

Albums

Studio albums

Live albums

Compilation albums

Box sets

EPs

Singles

Promotional singles

Videos

Video albums

Music videos

References

External links
 Discography Compiled by Vladimir Kruglov

Discographies of British artists
Pop music group discographies
New wave discographies